The Hammer was an automobile built in Detroit, Michigan by the Hammer Motor Company from 1905 to 1906.  The Hammer was a light car built with a two-cylinder, 12 hp engine in 1905.  This was replaced with a 24 hp, four-cylinder engine for 1906.  The five-seater tonneau weighted 1,800 lbs, and came with a choice of a planetary or sliding-gear transmission, with a shaft final drive.  The Hammer Motor Company was formed as part of the Hammer-Sommer when they became defunct in 1905.

References
 

Defunct motor vehicle manufacturers of the United States
Motor vehicle manufacturers based in Michigan
Defunct manufacturing companies based in Michigan